Dryops is a genus of long-toed water beetles in the family Dryopidae. There are at least 20 described species in the genus Dryops.

Species
These 24 species belong to the genus Dryops:

 Dryops algiricus (Lucas, 1846) g
 Dryops anglicanus Edwards, 1909 g
 Dryops arizonensis (Schaeffer, 1905) i c g b
 Dryops auriculatus (Geoffroy, 1785) g
 Dryops caspius (Menetries, 1832) g
 Dryops championi Dodero, 1918 g
 Dryops costae (Heyden, 1891) g
 Dryops doderoi Bollow, 1936 g
 Dryops ernesti Des Gozis, 1886 g
 Dryops femorata Fabricius, 1792 g
 Dryops gracilis (Karsch, 1881) g
 Dryops griseus (Erichson, 1847) g
 Dryops luridus (Erichson, 1847) i c g
 Dryops lutulentus (Erichson, 1847) g
 Dryops nitidulus (Heer, 1841) g
 Dryops raffrayi (Grouvelle, 1898) g
 Dryops renateae g
 Dryops rufipes (Krynicki, 1832) g
 Dryops similaris Bollow, 1936 g
 Dryops striatellus (Fairmaire & Brisout, 1859) g
 Dryops striatopunctatus (Heer, 1841) g
 Dryops subincanus (Kuwert, 1890) g
 Dryops sulcipennis (A.Costa, 1883) g
 Dryops viennensis (Heer, 1841) i c g b

Data sources: i = ITIS, c = Catalogue of Life, g = GBIF, b = Bugguide.net

References

Further reading

External links

 

Dryopidae